Peter A. O’Connor is a retired psychologist who had a private psychotherapy practice in Melbourne, Australia.

O'Connor was born in Melbourne in 1942.  A graduate of Melbourne University, he was Director of Counselling at the Marriage Guidance Council of Victoria for seven years.  In 1972 he was awarded the Winston Churchill Fellowship and completed a PhD in marriage and family counselling at the University of Southern California.  He has held several academic and clinical positions in Australia and overseas. O'Connor has had a longstanding involvement in working therapeutically with men and is a former columnist with the Good Weekend magazine.

O'Connor is the author of a number of books, including Mirror on Marriage (1973), Understanding Jung (1985), Dreams and the Search for Meaning (1986), The Inner Man (1993), Looking Inwards (2003) and Understanding the Mid-Life Crisis (1981) which is his best-known and most influential work.

Understanding the Mid-Life Crisis

Understanding the Mid-Life Crisis is in its eighth printing.
The mid-life crisis is a stage when many men and women are plagued by feelings that their life has no meaning or that their physical and mental powers are spent.
This time of apparent crisis can also be seen as a creative challenge, as a stimulus for deeper understanding and growth.
 It can be a time of coming to terms with yourself, understanding more about yourself and a time for taking new directions.

See also

Mid-life crisis

Bibliography 

O'Connor, P. (1981). Understanding the Mid-Life Crisis, Sun Australia,

References

1942 births
Living people
Australian psychologists
Australian non-fiction writers